Ángel Estuardo Díaz Granillo (born October 29, 1961) is a Guatemalan track and field athlete, specializing in the combined events of the decathlon.  He competed in the 1984 Olympics.  He also competed at the 1983 World Championships.

Díaz is a civil engineer in Guatemala.  He continues to participate in Masters athletics.  On May 29, 2017, Diaz broke the currently ratified M55 masters world record in the decathlon scoring 8,031 points to beat American William Murray's score from the Masters Athletics World Championships in 2009.  German Rolf Geese still holds a superior mark from 1999, recognized by the European Masters Athletics, but not World Masters Athletics.  Geese, now in the M70 division was also competing in the same meet at Stendal.

References

External links

Living people
1961 births
Guatemalan decathletes
Olympic athletes of Guatemala
Athletes (track and field) at the 1984 Summer Olympics
World Athletics Championships athletes for Guatemala
World record holders in masters athletics
Central American Games gold medalists for Guatemala
Central American Games medalists in athletics
Central American Games silver medalists for Guatemala
20th-century Guatemalan people
21st-century Guatemalan people